Dr. Cynthia R. McIntyre (born 1960) is a theoretical physicist and former Senior Vice President at the Council on Competitiveness. Her research focuses on the electronic and optical properties of semiconductor heterostructures. She was the second Black woman to receive a PhD in physics from the Massachusetts Institute of Technology.

Biography 

McIntyre was born in 1960 grew up in San Antonio, Texas, the only child of two school teachers. She received her PhD in physics in 1990 from the Massachusetts Institute of Technology in 1990. Her research focus is condensed matter physics, and she completed a dissertation "New models of magnetic interactions for bound magnetic polarons in dilute magnetic semiconductors" advised by Peter A. Wolff. When she was a graduate student, McIntyre co-founded the National Conference of Black Physics Students and organized the first NCBPS conference. For this work, she became one of the first recipients of the MIT's Dr. Martin Luther King Jr. Leadership Award in 1995. She continues to be involved in this organization.

McIntyre then went on to serve as the Commonwealth Professor of Physics at George Mason University.

Career 

 Chief of Staff to the President of Rensselaer Polytechnic Institute from 1999–2007.
 Governing Board of the American Physical Society (1998-2000).
 Board of Trustees for Spelman College (2003-2009).
 External Advisory Committee of the National High Magnetic Field Laboratory, Florida State University (2005 to present).
 Senior Vice President at the Council on Competitiveness
 She contributed to the development of policies aiding the use of high-performance computing (HPC) in the private sector for economic and competitive gains.

Awards 
HPCWire's People to Watch in 2013.
MIT's Dr. Martin Luther King Jr. Leadership Award in 1995.

References

External links
 Video: "Young, Gifted, and Black," MIT interview featuring McIntyre

Living people
Theoretical physicists
American women scientists
MIT Department of Physics alumni
21st-century American women
African-American physicists
1960 births